Tarab Khani (also Romanized as Tarāb Khānī) is a village in Mishan Rural District, Mahvarmilani District, Mamasani County, Fars Province, Iran. At the 2006 census, its population was 120, in 22 families.

References 

Populated places in Mamasani County